The 6th Africa Movie Academy Awards ceremony was held on 10 April 2010 at the Gloryland Cultural Center in Yenagoa, Bayelsa State, Nigeria, to honor the best African films of 2009. The nominees were announced on 6 March 2010 at the Mensvic Grand Hotel in Accra, Ghana at an event that was attended by delegates from Nigeria, top government officials from Ghana and African celebrities. Hollywood stars, Glynn Turman and CCH Pounder were the special guests from Hollywood. Approximately 280 films from 32 African countries were nominated for the awards.

Winners

Major awards 
The winners of the 24 Award Categories are listed first and highlighted in bold letters.

Additional awards

See also
CNN – Inside Africa – The African Movie Academy Awards ceremony, April 2010

References

Africa Movie Academy Awards
Africa Movie Academy Awards
Africa Movie Academy Awards ceremonies
Award
Africa Movie Academy Awards